Suchinta Chowdhury Chanchal, known as Chanchal Chowdhury, is a Bangladeshi actor. Critically acclaimed for his performances in Rupkothar Golpo (2006), Monpura (2009), Television (2012), Aynabaji (2016), Debi (2018) and Hawa (2022). He has received two Bangladesh National Film Awards for Best Actor and three Meril Prothom Alo Awards for Best Actor.

A household name in Bangladesh, Chowdhury started his career in 1996 in the theaters of Bangladesh. He joined famous theaters such as Aranyak Natyadal and performed in stage plays like Prakritojoner Kotha, Joyjoyonti, Ora Kodom Ali, Mayur Singhason, Songkranti, Rarang and Che-er Cycle. Albeit a prolific actor in TV series and films, he appeared in six movies as of 2018.

Early life
Chowdhury was born and raised in a Hindu family in the village of Kamarhaat in Pabna, Bangladesh, on 1 June 1971. His father's name is Radha Gobinda Chowdhury and mother's name is Nomita Chowdhury. He passed his SSC examination from Udaypur High School in 1990 and HSC examination from Rajbari Govt. College, Rajbari in 1992. He came to Dhaka in 1993 to apply for admission in the Department of Fine Arts at the University of Dhaka. His parents wanted him to be an engineer but an innate urge for art and culture drove him to become an actor.
Chanchal Chowdhury settled in Dhaka in 1993 and dived headfirst into as much culture as possible. As a third year student of DU, he joined 'Aronyak', a theater group of Legendary actor, director and scriptwriter Mamunur Rashid. Then he worked on stage for 10 years continuously. During this period, he played minor roles in different television dramas as well. His first role as a hero was in the drama Grash directed by Faridur Rahman. Meanwhile, Chowdhury pursued his profession in UODA as a lecturer of Fine Arts from 2001 to 2006.

Career
It was in 2004 that Fazlur Rahman Babu (actor) introduced Chowdhury to Gias Uddin Selim and Mostofa Sarwar Farooki. Chowdhury then started working more and more in television dramas. His initial works are Shurjer Hashi with Gias Uddin Selim, Talpatar Shepai, Nikhoj Shogbaad and a TV commercial, Maa with Mostofa Sarwar Farooki. At this point Chanchal's life took an upward surge towards success as the commercial gained him immense popularity.

Even the advertisement's jingle was sung by Chowdhury. Though he never had any formal singing lessons, he is gifted with the talent to sing. "I always listened to Hemanta Mukhopadhdhay and Bhupen Hajarika and sang those songs to myself; I told Mostofa Sarwar Farooki bhai to give me a chance to sing the jingle because I really thought that my voice would suit the song. Ayub Bachchu and Mostofa Sarwar Farooki then listened to my singing and later let me know that my song had been selected." Chowdhury later won the Meril-Prothom Alo award as the best model 2006 for this commercial. Chowdhury came into the spotlight for the first time as a model in the commercial of Grameenphone which became immensely popular at that time. Pother Klanti Bhule - a very popular song of Hemanta Mukherjee attracted some more attention onto the advertisement. Eventually, that advertise brought him the prestigious Meril-Prothom Alo award in "The Best Model - Men" category in 2005. The commercial was directed by Mostafa Sarwar Farooki, with whom, Chowdhury worked with on the serial 'Talpatar Shepai'.

After the commercial, Chowdhury's acting career started moving forward at a very good pace. He then worked with Salauddin Lavlu, Saidul Anam Tutul, Golam Sarwar Tutul and so on. Some of the dramas that Chowdhury specially likes are Vober Hat, Bongsho Rokkhe, Talpatar Shepai, Nikhoj Shongbaad, Ami Tumi Shottojit, Boral Parer Shitlai Gaon, Akjon Durbol Manush and also many more. The busy actor is also seen frequently in Eid-special TV plays.

Chowdhury plays a key role, called ‘Laley’, in Aronyak's popular production Shangkranti. In Che'er Cycle (a Bengali Theatre production), he plays six different characters including those of Fidel Castro and a peace-loving young boy, Shubhro — demonstrating his versatility. Chowdhury considers his performance in Che'er Cycle as one of his best works on stage so far. On his contemporaries, the actor says, several artistes are doing well. Among them, AKM Hasan, Mosharraf Karim, Shamim Zaman, Anisur Rahman Milon, Nusrat Imroz Tisha, Chandni and Richi Solaiman have done some impressive works. Chowdhury says that performing in front of the camera is relatively easy for him, thanks to his experience on stage. He adds, acting in films is more challenging than TV plays because of its duration and format. He has also been a playback singer, along with Meher Afroz Shaon, in the 2012 war film depicting the Bangladesh Liberation War, Pita 
Also known for famous children show "Sisimpur" where he played the character of "Mukul"

Personal life 
Chanchal Chowdhury faced online backlash after posting a picture with his mother on Mother's day 2020. On getting to know about his Hindu faith from the customary sindur on his mother's forehead, many people made derogatory remarks. Chanchal responded with poetry, encouraging harmony between all faiths.

Significant Works

Films

Television

Theatre

Web series

Awards and nominations

References

External links
 
 

1974 births
21st-century Bangladeshi male actors
Bangladeshi male film actors
Bangladeshi male stage actors
Bangladeshi male television actors
Male web series actors
Bengali male actors
Bengali male television actors
Living people
Bengali Hindus
Bangladeshi Hindus
Male actors in Bengali cinema
People from Dhaka
People from Sujanagar Upazila
Best Actor National Film Award (Bangladesh) winners
University of Dhaka alumni